The Gjelsvik Mountains are a group of mountains about  long, between the Sverdrup Mountains and the Mühlig-Hofmann Mountains in Queen Maud Land, East Antarctica.

Discovery and naming
The Gjelsvik Mountains were first photographed from the air and roughly plotted by the Third German Antarctic Expedition (1938–39). They were mapped in detail by Norwegian cartographers from surveys and air photos by the Norwegian–British–Swedish Antarctic Expedition (1949–52) and from air photos by the Norwegian expedition (1958–59). They were named for Tore Gjelsvik, Director of the Norwegian Polar Institute.

Features

 Bakhallet Slope
 Brugda Ridge
 Bundermann Range
 Jutulsessen
 Mayr Ridge
 Nupskammen Ridge
 Terningskarvet Mountain
 Von Essen Mountain

See also
 Gygra Peak
 List of mountains of Queen Maud Land

References

Mountain ranges of Queen Maud Land